Barnaby Potter (1577–1642) was a Church of England priest, Bishop of Carlisle from 16 March 1628-9 to 1642. He was educated at The Queen's College, Oxford, where he graduated MA in 1602 and DD in 1615. He was elected a fellow in 1604 and served as Provost, 1616–1626. Although leaning towards Puritanism he was liked by Charles I, who appointed him Chief Royal Almoner in 1628. He died in January 1641–42.

Notes

1577 births
1642 deaths
Alumni of The Queen's College, Oxford
Fellows of The Queen's College, Oxford
Provosts of The Queen's College, Oxford
Bishops of Carlisle
17th-century Church of England bishops